"One Way or Another" is a song by British rock band Uriah Heep. The song was released on their ninth studio album High and Mighty in June 1976, and became the only single from the album and the last single with the band's former vocalist, David Byron. The song was written by Ken Hensley and featured lead vocals from John Wetton and Ken Hensley. It was recorded from December 1975 to March 1976 in Roundhouse Recording Studios in London. The single did not chart, and it is the only song on the album that was not sung by David Byron.

Composition
The song is being played with seven chords and the chords are Dm7, G/D, Asus4, G, Bm, A, and Eb.

Personnel
 Mick Box – guitars
 David Byron – Backing vocals
 Ken Hensley – Lead Vocals, keyboard, 
 Lee Kerslake – drums
 John Wetton – Lead vocals, bass guitar

References

1976 singles
Uriah Heep (band) songs
Songs written by Ken Hensley